Jonathan Darwin Borja Colorado (born 5 April 1994) is an Ecuadorian footballer who plays for Cruz Azul.

Club career
He began his career with Deportivo Quevedo in 2012.

Career statistics

Honours
LDU Quito
Ecuadorian Serie A: 2018

References

1994 births
Living people
Association football midfielders
Ecuadorian footballers
Ecuadorian expatriate footballers
Ecuadorian Serie A players
Liga MX players
C.D. Quevedo footballers
S.D. Quito footballers
L.D.U. Loja footballers
Guayaquil City F.C. footballers
S.D. Aucas footballers
C.D. El Nacional footballers
L.D.U. Quito footballers
Cruz Azul footballers
People from Ibarra, Ecuador
Ecuador international footballers
Expatriate footballers in Mexico